Arturo Rojas de la Cámara (22 December 1930 – 8 January 2019) was a Spanish children's cartoonist. He held a longtime collaboration with the Spanish newspaper Editorial Valenciana.

References

External links
 Lambiek Comiclopedia page.

1930 births
2019 deaths
Spanish cartoonists
Spanish comics artists
People from Horta Oest